Intrepid Records may refer to:

 Intrepid Records (Canada), a Canadian independent record label in the 1980s and 1990s
 Intrepid Records (US), a short-lived American imprint owned and operated by Mercury Records